Marcellus Bowman (born June 24, 1988), nicknamed the Boomakat, was a professional Canadian football linebacker for the Hamilton Tiger-Cats of the Canadian Football League. He played college football as a safety at Boston College, and has also been a member of the Denver Broncos organization as an undrafted free agent signee. He signed with the Winnipeg Blue Bombers of the Canadian Football League as a free agent in the spring of 2010. At the conclusion of the 2012 season, Bowman signed a 2-year contract with the Hamilton Tiger-Cats.

References

External links
Hamilton Tiger-Cats bio 

1986 births
Living people
Canadian football linebackers
Hamilton Tiger-Cats players
Winnipeg Blue Bombers players
Boston College Eagles football players